Brendan Bell (born 11 May 1910) was a Scottish footballer who played for Dumbarton and Rangers.

References

1910 births
Scottish footballers
Dumbarton F.C. players
Rangers F.C. players
Year of death missing
Footballers from Fife
Association football goalkeepers
Kirkintilloch Rob Roy F.C. players